Pusa Institute of Technology is a government engineering college in New Delhi, India established in 1962. It is affiliated to the Delhi Skill and Entrepreneurship University of the Government of Delhi.

Introduction
Pusa Institute of Technology is an old institute in Delhi established in 1962. It is affiliated to the Delhi Skill and Entrepreneurship University and All India Council of Technical Education (AICTE).

In addition to the Audio-Visual training sessions, students are also provided with workshop training and industrial visits, organized for the students by the institute.

The institution has staff as per AICTE (All India Council For Technical Education) norms and AICTE pay scales/service conditions have been implemented. The institute has implemented Community scheme of Ministry of HRD (Government of India) and Stree Shakti Camps are attended by the staff of the institute.

Departments

Admission
Prospective students must appear for a Common Entrance Test conducted by the Delhi Skill and Entrepreneurship University (DSEU). The minimum eligibility to qualify for the CET is 35% aggregate in Science, Mathematics & English.
The admissions to the different streams are based on the Entrance test (Offline mode) taken by the Department Of Training & Technical Education (DTTE), Delhi in May /June every year.

Gallery

References

External links
 Techies-are-us - Community and alumni website for ALL BTE Delhi Polytechnics - Ambedkar, Pusa, GB Pant, Aryabhatt, Meera Bai, Kasturba, Guru Nanak Dev, Women's Poly

Universities and colleges in Delhi
Engineering colleges in Delhi